Bani Khatab is a sub-district located in Manakhah District, Sana'a Governorate, Yemen. Bani Khatab had a population of 4822 according to the 2004 census.

References 

Sub-districts in Manakhah District